Shani Alhassan Saibu is a Ghanaian politician and the newly selected northern regional minister of Ghana.

References 

Ghanaian politicians
Year of birth missing (living people)
Living people
Place of birth missing (living people)